Tom Quinn may refer to:

Tom Quinn (actor) (1934–2014), American actor in television and movies
Tom Quinn (American football) (born 1968), American football coach
Tom Quinn (astrophysicist), professor in the Department of Astronomy at the University of Washington (Seattle)
Tom Quinn (baseball) (1864–1932), American baseball player
Tom Quinn (footballer, born 1947), Australian rules footballer for Melbourne
Tom Quinn (nurse), English nurse
Tom Quinn (Spooks), a fictional television character
Tom Quinn, co-founder of American film production and distribution company Neon
Tommy Quinn (1908–1969), Australian rules footballer for Geelong

See also
Thomas Quinn (disambiguation)